Borøya or Borøy may refer to:

Places
Borøya, Bærum, an island in the municipality of Bærum in Viken county, Norway
Borøya, Kristiansand, an island in the municipality of Kristiansand in Agder county, Norway
Borøya, Tvedestrand, an island in the municipality of Tvedestrand in Agder county, Norway